Willy Rasmussen (6 November 1910 – 3 September 1958) was a Danish athlete who competed in the long jump at the 1936 Summer Olympics. Between 1929 and 1937 he won 19 national titles and set nine national records in the long jump, high jump, triple jump, decathlon and sprint running. His last long jump record stood from 1931 to 1964.

Rasmussen was a lawyer and had two sons: Olle, also a lawyer, and Gert Mandrup, a sports doctor.

References

1910 births
1958 deaths
Athletes (track and field) at the 1936 Summer Olympics
Olympic athletes of Denmark
Danish male long jumpers
Athletes from Copenhagen
20th-century Danish people